Mermaid Comedies are comedy short films that were produced in the United States. They were distributed by Earle W. Hammons' Educational Pictures and were at the high end of its comedy series brands.

Directors of the films included Al St. John and Arvid E. Gillstrom. The were promoted as the world's funniest 2-reelers.

Partial filmography
Duck Inn (1920)
A Fresh Start (1920)
The Vagrant (1921)
What a Night (1924), extant, part of MoMA's collection
His First Car (1924), directed by	Al St. John featuring Doris Deane. Extant.
Never Again (1924), directed by	Al St. John and featuring Carmencita
Stupid, But Brave (1924), directed by Roscoe Arbuckle, extant
Rapid Transit (1925), directed by	Al St. John. Lost.	
Red Pepper (1925), directed by Arvid E. Gillstrom and featuring Judy King. Extant in the MOMA's film collection
Curses! (1925)
Dynamite Doggie (1925), extant
Going Places
Uncle Sam

See also
List of American live-action shorts

References

American comedy short films
1920s comedy films
Educational Pictures short films
1920s American films